FDG may refer to:

Politics 
 Democratic Forces of Guiana, a political party in French Guiana
 Youth Front, the youth wing of the neofascist Italian Social Movement

Science 
 Fluorodeoxyglucose (18F)
 Fluid dynamic gauge

Other 
 Fording Canadian Coal Trust, a defunct Canadian trust
 Friedrich-Dessauer-Gymnasium, Frankfurt, a school in Germany
 Functional discourse grammar